The Audley End Miniature Railway is a miniature railway in Essex, England.

Overview
The -gauge circuit was built by Lord Braybrooke and was opened on 16 May 1964 by famous racing driver Sir Stirling Moss. The railway runs for  through woodland adjacent to Audley End House, former home of the Braybrookes, now in the ownership of English Heritage.

The woodland contains a large number of teddy bears and other soft toys arranged in displays. The line has two tunnels and crosses the River Cam and River Fulfen. The bridge across the Cam retains the original World War II pillbox.

The site is also home to the Saffron Walden & District Society of Model Engineers who run short circular ,  and  tracks at both raised and ground levels on Saturdays and Sundays during the summer months.

In January 2019 the railway's owners announced the sale of nine locomotives, including four by David Curwen, to “raise £180,000 and secure the railway's future”. The auction by Dreweatt's was scheduled for 12 March 2019.

References

 Lord Braybrooke, Audley End Railway 2004

External links
 Official web site

Miniature railways in the United Kingdom
7¼ in gauge railways in England
10¼ in gauge railways in England
Transport in Essex